Heartbreak Weather is the second studio album by Irish singer Niall Horan, released through Capitol Records on 13 March 2020. It was promoted with four singles: "Nice to Meet Ya", "Put a Little Love on Me", "No Judgement" and "Black and White".

On the Billboard 200 chart, Heartbreak Weather debuted at number four, marking Horan's second top-10 album in the United States. The album also debuted at number one on the Irish and UK album charts, marking Horan's first UK number one album as a solo artist.

Background and recording
Horan announced the album on 7 February 2020 alongside the release of the third single "No Judgement", and stated in a press release that with the album, he wanted to "tell the story that was in my head, hopefully lead people down the storytelling lane of an album track listing. [...] I wanted to write songs from different sides or from someone else looking in." Horan took inspiration from the work of Bruce Springsteen as well as the Arctic Monkeys and The Weeknd. The album was recorded from October 2018 to January 2020.

Promotion

Singles
"Nice to Meet Ya" was released as the album's lead single on 4 October 2019. The song was promoted with many live performances including at the 2019 MTV Europe Music Awards, Saturday Night Live and The Late Late Show with James Corden. In the official video, it mentioned Heartbreak Weather on a poster, at the timestamp 1:15. The song received a music video, directed by The Young Astronauts, which was released along with the song. The song entered many official charts worldwide including peaking at number 7 on the Irish Singles Chart, 22 on the UK Singles Chart and 63 on the US Billboard Hot 100.

"Put a Little Love on Me" serves as the second single from the album, being released on 6 December 2019. The song entered the Irish and Scottish singles chart peaking at number 32 and 38 respectively. The song received a music video which accompanied its release and was directed by Cameron Busby.

"No Judgement" was released on 7 February 2020 as the album's third single. The song was compared to Horan's 2017 single "Slow Hands". The song entered the Billboard Hot 100 and UK Singles chart peaking at number 97 and 32 respectively. The song's music video was released alongside the song and was directed by Drew Kirsch. The song also received a remix by Steve Void and an acoustic version. "Black and White" was released on 21 April 2020 as the album's fourth single.

Cancelled tour
Horan officially announced the Nice to Meet Ya Tour in October 2019. The tour was set to go through North America, Oceania, Europe and Latin America between April and December 2020. On 3 April 2020 Horan announced the tour was cancelled due to the COVID-19 pandemic. He stated he intended to tour in 2021, "when the crisis blows over." No, rescheduled dates have been announced. Lewis Capaldi, Fletcher and Maisie Peters were set to open for Horan on the tour.

Critical reception

Heartbreak Weather received generally favourable reviews from music critics. At Metacritic, which assigns a normalised rating out of 100 to reviews from mainstream publications, the album received an average score of 63, based on eight reviews, indicating "generally favorable reviews".

AllMusic's Neil Yeung reviewed the album positively, stating that the production of the album was better than Horan's 2017 debut album, Flicker, adding that "despite the often dour and forlorn lyrical content, the songs are full-blooded and more energetic than the average breakup album". Chris DeVille, writing for Stereogum, stated that the album is "much better" than Flicker, commenting that Heartbreak Weather writing, production, and performance all represented "an upgrade". However, he felt that "Horan is capable of evolving" but added that "such flourishes suggest this boy-band alumnus may someday grow up to be the man after all — or at the very least he won't be desperate for a reunion tour". Jason Scott, writing for American Songwriter, named the record "a stylistic leveling-up" while complimenting Horan's take on heartbreak. Michael Cragg of The Guardian highlighted that the album contains "hints of experimentation, such as the swaggering hybrid of Arctic Monkeys and Kasabian in "Nice To Meet Ya", but it's the excellent title track's flirtation with glossy, synth-tinged MOR that suggests where Horan might be headed next. Proof that it's often the quiet ones you need to keep an eye on". Mike Wass, writing for Idolator, wrote that the record "just might be pop's first, feel-good breakup album" and that "there's no sophomore slump here" while calling it "a winning collection of love songs from multiple perspectives with very few skips."

Some reviews were more mixed. Mark Kennedy of the Associated Press called the album an "overall bright collection" and felt that Horan made "14 perfectly fine tracks, if not volcanic ones" and that it "is in no way a disaster" but that "it's just not an improvement on his debut effort". Ella Kemp of NME called the album "a mixed bag" and felt that there was "a great voice let down by some not great songs", writing that Horan's "lyrical landscape is somewhat thinner and the production even more impenetrable" than that of Flicker. She concluded by complimenting Horan's "incredible" and "convincing" voice, adding that the album "isn't an entirely lost cause, but one to build upon for a more inspiring future all the same". Adam White, writing for The Independent, described Heartbreak Weather as "a tranquilliser of an album that only occasionally sparks to life" and "largely drab", explaining that Horan "struggles to define his musical identity on his shiny if haphazard second album" which is "entirely stuck on safe mode". Nevertheless, White specifically praised "New Angel" and "Arms of a Stranger", calling the latter "concert-ready and irresistibly shiny". Writing for The Telegraph, Neil McCormick felt like the album lacks "any particular character" and that "everything sounds like something you might have heard somewhere before", stating that the record is "the closest thing to a One Direction album since the band split". Ed Power of the Irish Examiner wrote that Horan "ticks the boxes but doesn't cause a storm". Quinn Moreland, writing for Pitchfork, felt the Horan "spends too much of the record bouncing between sounds and songwriting concepts to feel distinct" but did compliment the album's final track, "Still," calling it "the realest, rawest moment on the record and a small bit of proof that Horan has the potential to make it on his own."

Commercial performance
Heartbreak Weather debuted atop the Irish Albums Chart and UK Albums Chart.

In the United States, the album debuted at number four with 59,000 equivalent album units (42,000 pure) in its first week, making it the top-selling album of the week. The album also debuted at number one on the Top Album Sales chart, marking Horan’s second leader on the list, following his debut album, Flicker.

Track listing

Notes
  signifies a vocal producer

Personnel
Credits adapted from the liner notes of Heartbreak Weather.

Studios
Main recording locations

 Playpen (Calabasas)  recording 
 Sound City Studios (Sherman Oaks)  recording 
 SARM Music Village (London)  recording 
 Sanctuary Studios (The Bahamas)  recording 
 Inspiration Way (Los Angeles)  recording 
 Enemy Dojo (Calabasas)  recording 
 The Barn Studios (Richmond)  recording 
 State of the Ark Studios (Richmond)  recording 
 The Shed Studios (Van Nuys)  recording 
 Laurel House Studios (Los Angeles)  recording 
 Echo Studio (Los Angeles)  recording 
 Home Team (Nashville)  recording 

Additional recording locations

 Air Studios (London)  strings 

Engineering locations

 Camden Recording Studios (Dublin, Ireland)  additional engineering 

Mixing and mastering locations

 Mixsuite LA (Los Angeles)  mixing
 Sterling Sound (New York)  mastering

Vocals and musicians

 Niall Horan – lead vocals, background vocals , guitar , acoustic guitar 
 Julian Bunetta – background vocals , keys , bass , guitar , drums , piano , keyboards 
 John Ryan – background vocals , guitar , keys , bass 
 Jamie Scott – background vocals , piano, drums, bass , electric guitar, acoustic guitar, string arrangement 
 Tobias Jesso Jr. – background vocals 
 Afterhrs – keys 
 Nate Mercereau – guitar , bass 
 Teddy Geiger – guitar 
 Forrest Miller – fiddle 
 Derreck Wells – guitar 
 Mike Needle – background vocals 
 Daniel Bryer – background vocals, electric guitar , drums 
 Noah Conrad – acoustic guitar, electric guitar, drums, bass 
 Jake Cartwright – electric guitar , orchestral drum 
 Andrew Haas – bass 
 Ruth-Anne Cunningham – background vocals 
 Luke Potashnick – guitars , acoustic guitar, electric guitar 
 Songa Lee – violin 
 Charlie Bisharat – violin 
 Alma Fernandez – violin 
 Jacob Braun – cello 
 Greg Kurstin – guitar, bass , drums, synthesizers, keyboards , strings arrangement , piano , tiple 
 Aaron Sterling – drums , percussion 
 Benji Lysaght – guitar 
 Max Whipple – bass 
 Kane Richotte – percussion 
 Martin Hannah – shaker 
 Ed Blunt – string arrangement 
 Simon Baggs – violin 
 Danny Bhattacharya – violin 
 Shlomy Dobrinsky – violin 
 Cindy Foster – violin 
 Dorina Markoff – violin 
 Dominic Moore – violin 
 Helen Paterson – violin 
 Manuel Porta – violin 
 Patrick Savage – violin 
 Jo Watts – violin 
 Nick Barr – viola 
 Fiona Bonds – viola 
 Morgan Goff – viola 
 Yuri Zhislin – viola 
 Chris Fish – cello 
 Rachel Lander – cello 
 Conor Masterson – violin 
 Dernst (D'Mile) Emile II – organ

Production

 Jill Lamothe – production
 Julian Bunetta – production 
 Teddy Geiger – production 
 John Ryan – production 
 Afterhrs – production 
 Daniel Bryer – production, vocal production 
 Jamie Scott – production, vocal production 
 Noah Conrad – production 
 Mike Needle – vocal production 
 Greg Kurstin – production , strings production 
 Tobias Jesso Jr. – production 
 Jeff Gunnell – production

Technical

 Mark 'Spike' Stent – mixing
 Michael Freeman – mix assistant
 Matt Wolach – additional mix assistant
 Jeff Gunnell – engineering , assistant engineering , programming 
 Mike Malchicoff – engineering 
 Will Maclellan – assistant engineering 
 Veronica Wyman – engineering, assistant engineering 
 Richard Evatt – assistant engineering , engineering 
 Teddy Geiger – programming 
 Jesse Munsat – assistant engineering 
 John Ryan – programming , engineering 
 Julian Bunetta – programming , engineering 
 Afterhrs – programming 
 Martin Hannah – engineering 
 Noah Conrad – engineering, programming 
 Matt Cooke – assistant engineering , engineering 
 Jake Cartwright – assistant engineering 
 Jamie Scott – programming 
 Daniel Bryer – programming 
 Greg Kurstin – engineering 
 Alex Pasco – engineering 
 Julian Burg – engineering 
 Ed Reyes – additional engineering 
 Jack Power – additional engineering 
 Chris Gehringer – mastering
 Will Quinnell – assistant mastering

Artwork and management

 Liz Isik – A&R admin
 Erynn Hill – A&R coordinator
 Martha Braithwaite – business affairs
 David Helfer – business affairs
 The Young Astronauts – art direction
 Dean Martindale – photography
 Mitra Darab – marketing

Charts

Weekly charts

Year-end charts

Certifications

Release history

See also
List of 2020 albums

References

2020 albums
Capitol Records albums
Niall Horan albums
Albums produced by Tobias Jesso Jr.